Cornelius Lonzo Burdette (November 6, 1878 – April 30, 1955) was an American sport shooter who competed in the 1912 Summer Olympics.

He was born in Sandstone, West Virginia and died in Charleston, West Virginia. In 1912 he won the gold medal as a member of the American team in the team military rifle competition. In the 1912 Summer Olympics he also participated in the following events:

 600 metre free rifle - eighth place
 300 metre free rifle, three positions - 21st place
 300 metre military rifle, three positions - 52nd place

References

External links
profile

1878 births
1955 deaths
American male sport shooters
United States Distinguished Marksman
ISSF rifle shooters
Shooters at the 1912 Summer Olympics
Olympic gold medalists for the United States in shooting
Olympic medalists in shooting
Medalists at the 1912 Summer Olympics
19th-century American people
20th-century American people